Stephen Franks (born 1950) in Wellington, New Zealand is a commercial lawyer. At one time, he was chairman and Partner of the large firm Chapman Tripp. Franks has been a member of two political parties. He previously served as a List MP for the right-wing ACT New Zealand (Association of Consumers and Taxpayers). He then stood unsuccessfully for the National Party for the 2008 general election. Franks is also a media commentator and writer on legal and commercial topics; and is married with three daughters and a son in their 30s.

Early life
Franks was first educated at Taihape College, and then at Victoria where he studied Law (attained qualifications include BA/LLB (Hons) and Dip. Acc.). Franks was subsequently admitted to the bar in 1975.

Prior to entering Parliament in 1999 Franks' professional appointments included: being a member of the Securities Commission, Deputy chairman (1999–1999) of the Market Surveillance Panel of the New Zealand Stock Exchange having been a member of the MSP from its inception for nine years, and a Council member of the Institute of Directors in New Zealand.

Member of Parliament: 1999–2005

This high ranking (above several sitting MPs) was indicative of ACT's high hopes for Franks at the time – as a prominent lawyer, he was generally regarded as a significant asset for the party. During his six years in Parliament he was ACT spokesman for Justice, Corrections, the Police and Commerce. He added Maori Affairs and Sport in the last three years.

When Prebble announced his retirement from politics in early 2004, Franks was one of the four candidates who sought to take his place as leader of ACT. Franks ran on a platform of restoring the party's core message. Despite receiving the endorsement of party founder Roger Douglas, he was eventually defeated by Rodney Hide. After Hide became leader of the ACT party on 13 June, Franks remained the party's spokesperson for justice.

2005 election
Franks lost his seat in Parliament in the 2005 general election when the total percentage of the popular vote for ACT reduced the ACT Party to two seats in Parliament. He subsequently returned to practising law, rejoining his old firm, Chapman Tripp as a consultant. He later left this firm to set up his own commercial and public law practice, Franks & Ogilvie

2008 election and after
He lost the contest by 1904 votes to Labour's Grant Robertson.

His business interests presently centre around his public law practice, several company directorships, farming and manuka honey beekeeping.

References

Further reading

Franks' contribution is the opening address: "{U]pdate and overview of the commercial significance of company law reform." This paper also appears in the following publication:

Franks' contribution is the paper: "Justice for all."

Franks' contribution is the paper: "How should ACT treat the Treaty?"

Franks' contribution was participation in a panel discussion entitled: "[D]iscussing the principles of the Treaty of Waitangi"

Franks' contribution is the paper: "Law reform and indigeniety: going native: what indigeniety should look like in the morning."

Franks' contribution is the paper: "Liberals and the law."

External links
Personal website

1950 births
Living people
ACT New Zealand MPs
20th-century New Zealand lawyers
Victoria University of Wellington alumni
New Zealand list MPs
Unsuccessful candidates in the 2005 New Zealand general election
Unsuccessful candidates in the 2008 New Zealand general election
Members of the New Zealand House of Representatives
21st-century New Zealand politicians
21st-century New Zealand lawyers